The National Committee for Counter Trafficking (NCCT) is a national mechanism for coordinating and gathering information about the efforts of ministries, institutions, national and international NGOs, private sector, and other stakeholders to collaborate for combating human trafficking in transparent, accountable and high effective manner responding to the commitment of the Government to suppress trafficking in person (TIP). The mechanism plays crucial roles for providing opportunity to government, civil society organizations, development partners, and other public sectors for fighting against human trafficking, labor exploitation in Cambodia in close cooperation.

Current leadership
 Chairman: Sar Kheng
 Permanence Vice Chair: Chou Bun Eng

National working group
 Prevention working group
 Protection, Recovery, Reintegration and Repatriation working group
 Law Enforcement working group
 Justice working group
 Migration working group
 International Cooperation working group

General Secretariat

Leadership
 Secretary General: Police  Ponn Samkhan
 Deputy Secretary Generals:
 Police  Ran Serey Leakhena, International Cooperation working group and Information Technology
 Police  Khiev Chanra, Migration working group
 Police  Ly Tonghuy, Protection, Recovery, Reintegration and Repatriation working group
Police  Ou Manira, Protection, Recovery, Reintegration and Repatriation working group
 Police  Yem Virak, Justice working group
 Police  Sun Ro, Law Enforcement working group
 Police  Keo Sovannara, Prevention working group
Police  Te Sotharet
 Directors:
 Police  In Mean, International Cooperation working group and Information Technology
 Police  Hang Chivorn, Secretariat
Police  Ran Sopheak Vathana, Prevention working group
Police  Sek Siveth, Protection, Recovery, Reintegration and Repatriation working group
Police  Keo Phalla
Police  Srey Samdy, Migration working group

References

External links
Official Website
Remarks by Ambassador William A. Heidt at the Annual Meeting of the National Committee for Counter Trafficking

Human trafficking in Cambodia